Tillandsia vicentina is a species of flowering plant in the genus Tillandsia. This species is native to Oaxaca, Chiapas, Guatemala, El Salvador, Honduras, and Nicaragua.

References

vicentina
Flora of Mexico
Flora of Central America
Epiphytes
Plants described in 1923